Brad Scott or Bradley Scott may refer to:
 Brad Scott (American football) (born 1954), former American football head coach of the South Carolina Gamecocks
 Brad Scott (runner) (born 1988), Australian Paralympic Games competitor in athletics
 Brad Scott (New Zealand footballer) (born 1977), New Zealand soccer player
 Brad Scott (Australian footballer) (born 1976), coach of the Essendon Football Club, former coach of the North Melbourne Football Club and former Australian rules footballer with Brisbane Lions
 Brad Scott (fighter) (born 1989), English mixed martial artist
 Bradley Scott (cricketer) (born 1979), New Zealand bowler